Zinc phosphodiesterase ELAC protein 2 is an enzyme that in humans is encoded by the ELAC2 gene. on chromosome 17. It is an endonuclease thought to be involved in mitochondrial tRNA maturation,

Function 

The ELAC2 gene encodes a protein that is 92 kDa in size and is localized to the mitochondrion and the nucleus. The ELAC2 protein is a zinc phosphodiesterase, which is known to show tRNA 3'-processing endonuclease activity inside the mitochondria. Mitochondria contain their own pool of tRNAs that are involved in the protein translation of 13 subunits of the respiratory chain that are encoded by the mitochondrial genome. ELAC2 functions in the maturation of tRNA by removing a 3'-trailer (extra 3' nucleotides) from tRNA precursors, generating 3' termini of tRNAs.

The reaction leaves a 3'-hydroxy group is left at the tRNA end, and a 5'-phosphoryl group at the cleaved, trailing end. The reaction requires zinc ions as co-factors.

Clinical significance 

Variants of the ELAC2 gene are associated with prostate cancer, hereditary 2 (HPC2), a condition associated with familial cancer of the prostate. Multiple mutations including truncation and missense mutations are known to cause the disease from multiple families based on linkage analysis and positional cloning.

In addition, mutations in ELAC2 are known to cause combined oxidative phosphorylation deficiency 17 (COXPD17), a rare autosomal recessive disorder of mitochondrial functions characterized by severe hypertrophic cardiomyopathy.

References

Further reading